Sukch'ŏn station is a railway station in Sukch'ŏn-ŭp, Sukch'ŏn County, South P'yŏngan Province, North Korea. It is on located on the P'yŏngŭi Line of the Korean State Railway.

History
The station was opened, together with the rest of this section of the Kyŏngŭi Line, on 5 November 1905. Originally called Shukusen station, it was given its current name in July 1945.

References

Railway stations in North Korea